PRB is an Australian builder of Clubman-style sportscars (i.e. cars based on Colin Chapman's ground-breaking Lotus Super Seven design), the PRB Clubman was created by Peter Raymond Bladwell in 1978. Bladwell's first order was received from John Ribeiro, a racing driver from Canberra, Australian Capital Territory, who went on to win the New South Wales State Hill Climb Championship in his PRB.  There are now several hundred PRB Clubmans on Australian roads. The cars compete very successfully, primarily in Club motorsport. An acceleration time of 0 – 100 km/h in less than 4 seconds is achievable in a modified car.

The current PRB clubman is a composite monocoque design utilising aluminium honeycomb construction. It is only available as a build it yourself kit for owner assembly, or can be assembled by a local PRB agent. The aluminium construction makes for a lighter and more rigid car.

The PRB S3 differentiates itself from many of the other kit cars available in Australia by using mostly new parts, many fabricated specifically for the S3. The latest model S3 utilises an engine from a Ford Focus, Toyota Celica or for racing purposes a Toyota 4AGE 1600.

External links
PRB Australia Unofficial Website

Car manufacturers of Australia
Kit car manufacturers
Lotus Seven replicas